Botines was a 2005 Argentine miniseries, produced by Pol-Ka. Each episode had a specific cast, and the plot was based on a real crime, either from Argentina or another country. Diego Peretti won the Martín Fierro Award and the Clarín Award as best actor, Inés Esteves the Martín Fierro as best actress, and Rodrigo de la Serna the Clarín as best actor.

Argentine police procedural television series
Pol-ka telenovelas
2005 Argentine television series debuts
2005 Argentine television series endings
2000s anthology television series
2005 telenovelas
Spanish-language telenovelas